Lisey's Story is a 2021 American psychological horror drama miniseries based on the 2006 novel of the same name by Stephen King. The series is written by King, directed by Pablo Larraín, and produced by J. J. Abrams. It stars Julianne Moore in the title role. Lisey's Story premiered on Apple TV+ on June 4, 2021.

Premise
Lisa "Lisey" Landon is the widow of famous fiction author Scott Landon, who died two years prior to the start of the series. Lisey is still mourning Scott, and fending off parties who are interested in obtaining Scott's unpublished manuscripts. While sorting through Scott's possessions, Lisey discovers that Scott has left her a treasure hunt, which has her revisiting memories of their marriage, especially suppressed memories of unusual abilities that Scott had. While Lisey pursues this treasure hunt, she gains a dangerous stalker who believes that she is selfishly keeping Scott's genius from the world.

Cast

Main
 Julianne Moore as Lisa "Lisey" Landon (nee Debusher)
 Clive Owen as Scott Landon
 Jennifer Jason Leigh as Darla Debusher
 Dane DeHaan as Jim Dooley
 Joan Allen as Amanda Debusher

Recurring
 Ron Cephas Jones as Prof. Roger Dashmiel
 Michael Pitt as Andrew Landon
 Omar Metwally as Dr. Hugh Alberness
 Sung Kang as Officer Dan Boeckman
 Peter Scolari as Dave Debusher
 Will Brill as Gerd Allen Cole

Episodes

Production

Development
In August 2017, Stephen King expressed an interest in seeing his novel adapted as a television series: "Lisey's Story is my favorite of the books and I would love to see that done, especially now that there's a kind of openness on the streaming services on TV and even the cable networks. There's more freedom to do stuff now and when you do a movie from a book, there's this thing that I call the sitting on a suitcase syndrome. That is where you try to pack in all the clothes at once and the suitcase won't close. So it's tough to take a book that is fully textured, and do it in two hours and 10 minutes. But as a TV show you have 10 hours."

In April 2019, it was announced that Apple Inc. had acquired the rights to the novel and gave it an eight-episode straight-to-series order to air on Apple TV+, with all episodes scripted by King, to be produced by J. J. Abrams and Bad Robot Productions. In August 2019, Pablo Larraín had signed on to direct the miniseries.

In February 2020, it was announced that Darius Khondji had joined the series as cinematographer.

Casting
Julianne Moore was cast in the leading role of Lisey. In October 2019, Clive Owen was added to the cast, with Joan Allen and Dane DeHaan joining in November, and Sung Kang joining in December. In January 2020, Jennifer Jason Leigh was revealed to be in the cast. When Apple announced a first look of Lisey's Story in February 2021, it was also revealed that Ron Cephas Jones was in the cast.

Filming
Filming began in October 2019 at the historic Van Liew-Suydam House in Franklin Township, Somerset County, New Jersey. In December 2019, filming took place in the village of Tuckahoe in Westchester County, New York. In mid-March 2020, filming was shut down due to the COVID-19 pandemic. Larraín said that "a few weeks" of shooting were left before the shutdown occurred. In September 2020, Julianne Moore shared that filming for her character was complete.

Release 
On January 6, 2021, Apple announced that Lisey's Story would premiere in 2021. The following month, Apple revealed a first look of the series, where it was announced that Lisey's Story would have a mid-2021 premiere.

In a first look with Vanity Fair in April 2021, it was announced that Lisey's Story will premiere on Apple TV+ with the first two episodes releasing on June 4, 2021, and new episodes each Friday after.

On May 11, 2021, Apple released a trailer for the miniseries.

On June 4, 2021, the series debuted on Apple TV+ with the release of the first two episodes.

Reception
On the review aggregator Rotten Tomatoes, Lisey's Story holds an approval rating of 54% based on 69 reviews, with an average rating of 5.92/10. The website's critics consensus reads, "Despite an admirable performance from Julianne Moore, Lisey's Story is weighed down by an overreliance on its source material and a sluggish pace." On Metacritic, which uses a weighted average, the miniseries has a score of 48 out of 100 based on 24 reviews, indicating "mixed or average reviews".

Accolades

References

External links
 
 
 

Television shows based on works by Stephen King
2020s American drama television miniseries
2020s American horror television series
2021 American television series debuts
2021 American television series endings
Television series by Bad Robot Productions
Television series by Warner Bros. Television Studios
Apple TV+ original programming
Television shows written by Stephen King
Television productions suspended due to the COVID-19 pandemic
Television shows filmed in New Jersey
Television shows filmed in New York (state)